Jeffrey C. Thomas (January 1, 1940 – September 16, 2009) was a physician who lived and practiced in Janesville, Wisconsin. United States He was a seven-time candidate for United States Congress in Wisconsin's 1st congressional district. Thomas last won the Democratic nomination in a five-way primary held in September, 2006.

Background
Thomas graduated from Janesville High School in 1958 and from Dartmouth College in 1962. He attended the University of Wisconsin Medical School, where he graduated in 1966. He became board-certified in orthopedic surgery in 1974, and was a member of the American Academy of Orthopedic Surgeons.

At one time, Thomas was associated with Mercy Health System of Janesville. After he retired, he operated the Well Stone Free Clinic.

Political career
Thomas served 12 years on the Janesville School Board and four years on the Janesville City Council.

He ran for Congress 7 times. In his Congressional campaigns he described his primary issues as "health care, health care, health care". In the 2006 election, Thomas was critical of incumbent Republican Paul Ryan and other politicians who had received money from Tom DeLay's Americans for a Republican Majority political action committee and from indicted lobbyist Jack Abramoff.

Electoral history
2006 Race for U.S. House of Representatives—1st District
Paul Ryan (R) (inc.), 160,033 votes, 63%
Jeffrey Thomas (D), 95,303 votes, 37%
2004 Race for U.S. House of Representatives—1st District
Paul Ryan (R) (inc.), 65%
Jeffrey Thomas (D), 33%
2002 Race for U.S. House of Representatives—1st District
Paul Ryan (R) (inc.), 67%
Jeffrey Thomas (D), 31%
2000 Race for U.S. House of Representatives—1st District
Paul Ryan (R) (inc.), 67%
Jeffrey Thomas (D), 33%

References 

1940 births
2009 deaths
Physicians from Wisconsin
Wisconsin Democrats
Politicians from Janesville, Wisconsin
Wisconsin city council members
University of Wisconsin School of Medicine and Public Health alumni
20th-century American politicians